The Canadian Journal of Sociology publishes research and theory by social scientists on Canadian and world culture. The journal is hosted by the University of Alberta in Edmonton, Alberta.

Abstracting and indexing 
Canadian Journal of Sociology is abstracted and indexed in the Social Sciences Citation Index. According to the Journal Citation Reports, the journal has a 2014 impact factor of 0.500, ranking it 101st out of 142 journals in the category "Sociology".

See also 
 Journal of Indigenous Studies

References

External links 
 Sociology Department, University of Alberta

Sociology journals
Quarterly magazines published in Canada